Handball competition has been in the Universiade only at  2015 as optional sport.

Events

Medal table 
Last updated after the 2015 Summer Universiade

External links 
International Handball Federation

 
Universiade